Diplusodon is a genus of flowering plants belonging to the family Lythraceae.

Its native range is Brazil to Bolivia.

Species:

Diplusodon adpressipilus 
Diplusodon aggregatifolius 
Diplusodon alatus 
Diplusodon appendiculosus 
Diplusodon argenteus 
Diplusodon argyrophyllus 
Diplusodon astictus 
Diplusodon bahiensis 
Diplusodon bolivianus 
Diplusodon bradei 
Diplusodon burchellii 
Diplusodon buxifolius 
Diplusodon caesariatus 
Diplusodon canastrensis 
Diplusodon candollei 
Diplusodon capitalensis 
Diplusodon capitatus 
Diplusodon chapadensis 
Diplusodon ciliatiflorus 
Diplusodon ciliiflorus 
Diplusodon cordifolius 
Diplusodon cryptanthus 
Diplusodon decussatus 
Diplusodon divaricatus 
Diplusodon epilobioides 
Diplusodon ericoides 
Diplusodon fastigiatus 
Diplusodon floribundus 
Diplusodon foliosus 
Diplusodon glaucescens 
Diplusodon glaziovii 
Diplusodon glocimarii 
Diplusodon gracilis 
Diplusodon grahamiae 
Diplusodon hatschbachii 
Diplusodon helianthemifolius 
Diplusodon heringeri 
Diplusodon hexander 
Diplusodon hirsutus 
Diplusodon imbricatus 
Diplusodon incanus 
Diplusodon irwinii 
Diplusodon kielmeyeroides 
Diplusodon lanceolatus 
Diplusodon leucocalycinus 
Diplusodon longipes 
Diplusodon lythroides 
Diplusodon macrodon 
Diplusodon marginatus 
Diplusodon mattogrossensis 
Diplusodon micromerus 
Diplusodon microphyllus 
Diplusodon minasensis 
Diplusodon mononeuros 
Diplusodon myrsinites 
Diplusodon nigricans 
Diplusodon nitidus 
Diplusodon oblongus 
Diplusodon orbicularis 
Diplusodon ovatus 
Diplusodon panniculatus 
Diplusodon paraisoensis 
Diplusodon parvifolius 
Diplusodon petiolatus 
Diplusodon plumbeus 
Diplusodon psammophilus 
Diplusodon puberulus 
Diplusodon punctatus 
Diplusodon pygmaeus 
Diplusodon quintuplinervius 
Diplusodon ramosissimus 
Diplusodon retroimbricatus 
Diplusodon rosmarinifolius 
Diplusodon rotatus 
Diplusodon rotundifolius 
Diplusodon rupestris 
Diplusodon saxatilis 
Diplusodon sessiliflorus 
Diplusodon sigillatus 
Diplusodon smithii 
Diplusodon sordidus 
Diplusodon speciosus 
Diplusodon stellatus 
Diplusodon strigosus 
Diplusodon subsericeus 
Diplusodon thymifolius 
Diplusodon thysanosepalus 
Diplusodon trigintus 
Diplusodon ulei 
Diplusodon uninervius 
Diplusodon urceolatus 
Diplusodon venosus 
Diplusodon verruculosus 
Diplusodon vidalii 
Diplusodon villosissimus 
Diplusodon villosus 
Diplusodon virgatus 
Diplusodon vittatus 
Diplusodon xerampelinus 
Diplusodon xiphodon

References

Lythraceae
Lythraceae genera